The 2009 New England Revolution season was the fourteenth season of the team's existence, and the eighth straight in which the team made the playoffs. It began on March 21 with a 1–0 road win over the San Jose Earthquakes and ended on November 7 with a 2–0 loss to the Chicago Fire (the Revs lost the series 3–2 on aggregate).

Squad

First-team squad
As of August 8, 2009.

Transfers

In

Out

Club

Management

Other information

Competitions

Overall

Major League Soccer

Standings

Results summary

Matches

MLS regular season

MLS playoffs

SuperLiga 2009

U.S. Open Cup

References

External links 
2009 Schedule

New England Revolution seasons
New England Revolution
New England Revolution
New England Revolution
Sports competitions in Foxborough, Massachusetts